Funk Man (The Stimulus Package) is the sixth solo studio album by American hip hop musician Del the Funky Homosapien. It was released through his Bandcamp page for free in 2009. To promote the album, Del released a video on YouTube.

Critical reception
Thomas Quinlan of Exclaim! gave the album a favorable review, saying: "Despite being a free download, Funk Man has all the style and quality of a professional release, and is arguably his best work since Deltron 3030."

Track listing

References

Further reading

External links
 

2009 albums
Del the Funky Homosapien albums